Gideon Scheepers (1878–1902) was a Boer military leader, scout and heliographer during the Anglo-Boer War (also known as the South African war). He is remembered for having been executed for war crimes.

Early years

Gideon Jacobus Scheepers was born on 4 April 1878 in Middelburg in the Colony of Transvaal. When he turned 16 he trained as a heliographer (a specialist trained to use a mirror and sunlight to transmit messages to other troops) in the State Artillery. In 1898 he was seconded to the Orange Free State and promoted to sergeant.

Anglo-Boer War

He accompanied the Free State commandos to its western border. During the Siege of Kimberley he shot two captured natives (then the polite term) on the grounds that they were allegedly scouts. General Christiaan de Wet used him as a scout and later promoted him to captain in charge of his own reconnaissance corps.

Invasion of the Cape

In December 1900 Scheepers was a member of commandant Kritzinger's commando that  invaded the Cape Colony. Within eight weeks their ways parted when Kritzinger returned to the Free State. After recruiting many Cape rebels, he was promoted to commandant of 150 men, marauding in the Cape. Kritzinger's commando sabotaged British rail and telegraph lines. They executed blacks accused of spying for the British. They burnt houses, shops and public buildings. In September 1901 Scheepers started getting ill. By 10 October, when they were close to the Prince Albert Road station, he was too ill to stay with his commando and he had to be left behind. The British captured him on 12 October and he was given the necessary medical treatment. By December 1901 he had recovered sufficiently to be taken to the gaol in Graaff-Reinet.

Court martialled and shot

Scheepers faced 16 charges in a court martial: 7 of murder, 1 of attempted murder, 1 that he placed a prisoner in the enemy's line of fire, 1 of maltreatment of a POW, 3 of assault, 2 of malicious injury to property and 1 of arson (15 incidents). 54 witnesses were called to testify for the prosecution. Scheepers appointed his own attorney Carl Auret to defend him.

Scheepers was convicted on all counts except one of the murder charges. He was sentenced to death. On 18 January 1902 he was executed by firing squad, while tied to a chair. He was reburied during the night in an unknown grave, and to this day his place of burial is unknown.

Cultural depictions 

 Gideon Scheepers (1982) - an Afrikaans language movie about Scheepers' trial and execution.

References

1878 births
1902 deaths
People executed for war crimes
Orange Free State military personnel of the Second Boer War